Kim Hye-seong (born January 27, 1999) is a South Korean professional baseball infielder for the Kiwoom Heroes of the KBO League.

In 2016, Kim received the Lee Young-min Batting Award, given to the top-hitting high school player in Republic of Korea.

References

External links

Living people
Kiwoom Heroes players
KBO League infielders
Baseball players at the 2020 Summer Olympics
Place of birth missing (living people)
1999 births
Olympic baseball players of South Korea
People from Goyang
Sportspeople from Gyeonggi Province
2023 World Baseball Classic players